Serthi Gewog (Dzongkha: གསེར་ཐིག་) is a gewog (village block) of Samdrup Jongkhar District, Bhutan.

References

Gewogs of Bhutan
Samdrup Jongkhar District